William Cowan (born 28 April 1959) is a Canadian former professional tennis player.

Cowan, a Toronto native, featured in the singles main draw at the 1981 US Open.

Between 1982 and 1984, Cowan competed in four Davis Cup ties for Canada. He won his only singles rubber, over Venezuela's Abraham Sojo, but was less successful in doubles, losing all four rubbers.

See also
List of Canada Davis Cup team representatives

References

External links
 
 
 

1959 births
Living people
Canadian male tennis players
Tennis players from Toronto
20th-century Canadian people
21st-century Canadian people